Stanisław Rola (born January 28, 1957) is a retired male race walker from Poland, who represented his native country at the 1980 Summer Olympics in Moscow, USSR. There he ended up in seventh place in the men's 50 km race, clocking 4:07.07. He was born in Warsaw, Mazowieckie.

References
sports-reference

1957 births
Living people
Polish male racewalkers
Olympic athletes of Poland
Athletes (track and field) at the 1980 Summer Olympics
Athletes from Warsaw